is a 1983 Japanese television series. It is the 21st NHK taiga drama. The drama is based on the novel of the same name by Sōhachi Yamaoka.

Plot
The story chronicles the life of Tokugawa Ieyasu.

Production
Production Credits
Original – Souhachi Yamamoto
Music – Isao Tomita
Narrator – Naomitsu Tateno
Historical research – Keizō Suzuki
Sword fight arranger - Kunishirō Hayashi

Cast

Starring role
 Sakae Takita as Tokugawa Ieyasu (episodes 7-50)
Yōji Matsuda as Teen Ieyasu (episode 6)
Yoshitaka Kase as Child Ieyasu (episodes 3-5)

Tokugawa clan
Shinobu Otake as Odai no Kata - mother of Ieyasu
Masaomi Kondō as Matsudaira Hirotada - father of Ieyasu
Kaoru Yachigusa as Keyōin - grandmother of Ieyasu
Kimiko Ikegami as Lady Tsukiyama - wife of Ieyasu
Hiroshi Katsuno as Tokugawa Hidetada - third son of Ieyasu
Hiroyuki Nagato as Honda Sakuzaemon
Shinjirō Ehara as Ishikawa Kazumasa
Taketoshi Naito as Honda Masanobu
Yosuke Natsuki as Yagyū Munenori
Hirotarō Honda as Honda Masazumi
Sen Yamamoto as Itakura Katsushige
Seiji Miyaguchi as Torii Tadayoshi
Sei Hiraizumi as Ii Naomasa
Kōsuke Toyohara as Ii Naomasa (young)
Katsumasa Uchida as Sakakibara Yasumasa
Masuyo Iwamoto as Asahi-hime - second wife of Ieyasu
Keiko Takeshita as Lady Saigō - concubine of Ieyasu
Ken Tanaka as Matsudaira Tadateru - sixth son of Ieyasu
Masahiko Tsugawa as Ōkubo Nagayasu
Junkichi Orimoto as Ōkubo Tadayo
Hideyuki Hori as Yūki Hideyasu - second son of Ieyasu
Jouji Nakata as Ōkubo Tadakazu

Oda clan
Kōji Yakusho as Oda Nobunaga
Takao Itō as Oda Nobuhide
Mariko Fuji as Nōhime
Minori Terada as Akechi Mitsuhide
Rokko Toura as Hirate Masahide

Toyotomi clan
Tetsuya Takeda as Toyotomi Hideyoshi
Kazuko Yoshiyuki as Nene - wife of Hideyoshi
Mitsue Suzuki as Ōmandokoro - mother of Hideyoshi
Masako Natsume as Yodo-dono - concubine of Hideyoshi
Gō Rijū as Toyotomi Hideyori - son of Hideyoshi
Mariko Ishihara as Senhime - wife of Hideyori
Takeshi Kaga as Ishida Mitsunari
Yūsuke Kawazu as Shima Sakon
Akira Kume as Katagiri Katsumoto
Yasunori Irikawa as Kuroda Kanbei
Junpei Morita as Asano Yoshinaga
Council of Five Elders
Tetsurō Sagawa as Maeda Toshiie
Shinsuke Mikimoto as Mōri Terumoto
Tōru Yokoi as Uesugi Kagekatsu
Mitsuo Hamada as Ukita Hideie

Imagawa clan
Mikio Narita as Imagawa Yoshimoto
Yoichi Hayashi as Imagawa Ujizane
Keiju Kobayashi as Sessai Choro, Ieyasu's master

Takeda clan
Kei Satō as Takeda Shingen
Shinji Tōdō as Takeda Katsuyori
Shōbun Inoue as Yamagata Masakage
Takeo Namai as Anayama Nobukimi

Others
Gō Wakabayashi as Sanada Yukimura
Goro Ibuki as Katō Kiyomasa
Katsuhiko Watabiki as Fukushima Masanori
Hiroshi Arikawa as Ōtani Yoshitsugu
Jun Tazaki as Shimazu Yoshihiro
Onoe Tatsunosuke I as Date Masamune
Kōji Ishizaka as Naya Shōan (fictional character)
Misako Konno as Kinomi (fictional character)
Gorō Mutsumi as Naoe Kanetsugu
Masami Horiuchi as Kobayakawa Hideaki
Yūsuke Takita as Ankokuji Ekei
Raita Ryū as Tenkai
Jin Nakayama as Chaya Shirōjirō Kiyonobu

TV schedule

References

External links

NHK Tokugawa Ieyasu official

Taiga drama
1983 Japanese television series debuts
1983 Japanese television series endings
Cultural depictions of Akechi Mitsuhide
Cultural depictions of Date Masamune
Cultural depictions of Oda Nobunaga
Cultural depictions of Tokugawa Ieyasu
Cultural depictions of Toyotomi Hideyoshi
Cultural depictions of Sanada clan
Jidaigeki
Television shows based on Japanese novels